Rutherford is an unincorporated community in Champaign County, Illinois, United States. Rutherford is located along a railroad line east of Sidney.

References

Unincorporated communities in Champaign County, Illinois
Unincorporated communities in Illinois